"Lilla stjärna" (literally "Little star") performed by Alice Babs was the  entry to the Eurovision Song Contest 1958 held in Hilversum, the Netherlands. This was Sweden's first song in the contest, and the first time that the Swedish language was performed on the Eurovision stage.

Sweden's first participation in the contest was the source of some controversy between the artist Alice Babs and the composer; the song was originally titled "Samma stjärnor lysa för oss två" ("The same stars shine for the two of us"), but neither Sveriges Radio nor Babs approved of the lyrics and commissioned journalist and lyricist  (at the time an employee of the TV station) to rewrite the song as well as providing it with a new title: "Lilla stjärna" – this without the knowledge or approval of original composer Åke Gerhard. As a result of this, Gerhard in turn would not allow Alice Babs to make a studio recording of what legally still was his work, albeit in considerably rewritten form. The only existing audio recording of "Lilla stjärna" is consequently sourced from the TV footage of Babs' live performance at the Contest in Hilversum, which had its first commercial release as part of the Swedish CD compilation Rätt Låt Vann?! – Vinnarna in 1994.

Dressed in the Leksand national costume, Babs performed 5th in the running order on the night of the contest, following 's Solange Berry with "Un grand amour" and preceding 's Raquel Rastenni with "Jeg rev et blad ud af min dagbog". The song received 10 points, placing 4th in a field of 10.

The song was succeeded as Swedish representative at the Eurovision Song Contest 1959 by Brita Borg with "Augustin".

In popular culture

The name of John Ajvide Lindqvist's novel Lilla stjärna is taken from the song title.

References

Eurovision songs of 1958
Eurovision songs of Sweden
Alice Babs songs
1958 songs
Songs written by Åke Gerhard